Attila Kugler (born 16 September 1986) is a Hungarian canoeist. He placed 11th in the K-4 1000 metres event at the 2016 Summer Olympics.

References

External links
 

1986 births
Living people
Hungarian male canoeists
Olympic canoeists of Hungary
Canoeists at the 2016 Summer Olympics
Sportspeople from Budapest
21st-century Hungarian people